Archibald MacIndoe McNair (28 September 1880 – 18 February 1960) was an Australian rules footballer who played for the South Melbourne Football Club in the Victorian Football League (VFL).

He subsequently played for Richmond in the VFA and later served as a committeeman and treasurer of the club.

Notes

External links 

1880 births
1960 deaths
Australian rules footballers from Melbourne
Sydney Swans players
Richmond Football Club (VFA) players
People from Richmond, Victoria
Richmond Football Club administrators